is a subway station on the Tokyo Metro Yurakucho Line in the Kōjimachi neighborhood of Chiyoda, Tokyo, Japan, operated by the Tokyo Subway operator Tokyo Metro. Its station number is Y-15.

Lines
Kōjimachi Station is served by the Tokyo Metro Yūrakuchō Line.

Station layout

History
The station opened on 30 October 1974.

Passenger statistics
An average of 54,889 passengers used this station daily in fiscal 2006.

See also
 List of railway stations in Japan

References

External links

 Kōjimachi Station information 

Railway stations in Japan opened in 1974
Stations of Tokyo Metro
Tokyo Metro Yurakucho Line
Railway stations in Tokyo